is a Japanese former professional footballer who played as a midfielder. He is the current first-team coach J2 League club of Omiya Ardija.

Playing career 
Kanazawa was born in Saitama on 9 September 1983. He joined J2 League club Omiya Ardija from youth team in 2002. He played many matches as defensive midfielder from first season and became a regular player in 2004. Ardija also won the 2nd place in 2004 season and was promoted to J1 League first time in the club history. However his opportunity to play decreased in 2005. He was loaned to newly was relegated to Tokyo Verdy in 2006. He played many matches in 2 seasons and Verdy was returned to J1 end of 2007 season. He returned to Ardija in 2008. He played many matches for the club for a long time. However Ardija repeated relegation to J2 and promotion to J1 from 2015. His opportunity to play decreased from 2017.

After the 2019 season, Kanazawa announced his retirement from professional football.

Club statistics

References

External links 
 

1983 births
Living people
Association football people from Saitama Prefecture
Japanese footballers
J1 League players
J2 League players
Omiya Ardija players
Tokyo Verdy players
Association football midfielders